Pueblo School District 60 (D60), formerly Pueblo City Schools, is a school district serving Pueblo, Colorado. Its headquarters, the Administrative Services Center, are in Pueblo.

History
It was formed on March 4, 1946, with the consolidation of Pueblo School District 1 and Pueblo School District 20 to form Pueblo School District 60. It was known as Pueblo City Schools from 2006 until it reverted to its original name in August 2019.

Schools

High schools
 Central High School
 Centennial High School
 East High School
 South High School

K-8 schools
Goodnight School

4-8 schools
 Corwin International Magnet School

Middle schools
Heaton Middle School 	
Pueblo Academy of Arts
Risley International Academy of Innovation
Roncalli STEM Academy

Elementary schools
Zoned:

Magnet-only:
 Fountain International Magnet School (K-3)

Charter schools
 Chavez-Huerta K-12 Preparatory Academy
 Pueblo School for Arts and Sciences

Other facilities
The Orman-Adams Mansion, now a private residence, was used by the school district from 1952 until 1979; the district used it for office space.

References

External links

Pueblo, Colorado
School districts in Colorado
Education in Pueblo County, Colorado
1946 establishments in Colorado
School districts established in 1946